The Ribault Club is an historic building on Fort George Island near Jacksonville, Florida. It is now home to the Fort George Island Visitor Center. The building was designed in a Colonial Revival architecture style and is credited to Maurice Fatio and Mellen Clark Greeley. It was added to the U.S. National Register of Historic Places on May 11, 2000, and is located on Fort George Road. It was built in 1928 for winter recreation on the site of a former hotel and is considered a legacy of Fort George Island's resort era. Winter recreational opportunities included golf, tennis, hunting, fishing, and yachting. Today many weddings are held at the Club. The building is listed as a Historic Landmark by the City of Jacksonville. It became part of the Fort George Island Cultural State Park in 1989.

References

External links

 Duval County listings at National Register of Historic Places
 Ribault Clubhouse at Florida's Office of Cultural and Historical Programs

Buildings and structures in Jacksonville, Florida
History of Jacksonville, Florida
National Register of Historic Places in Jacksonville, Florida
Northside, Jacksonville
Hotels in Jacksonville
Timucuan Ecological and Historic Preserve
1989 establishments in Florida
Museums in Jacksonville, Florida
1928 establishments in Florida
Fort George Island